Howard Williams (6 January 1837 – 21 September 1931) was an English humanitarianism and vegetarianism activist, and writer. He was noted for authoring The Ethics of Diet, a history of vegetarianism, which was influential on the Victorian vegetarian movement.

Biography 
Williams was a born on 6 January 1837, in Whatley, Mendip, the fifth son of the Reverend Hamilton John Williams and Margaret Sophia; one of his older brothers was the priest and animal rights and vegetarianism activist Henry John Williams. He was home educated, then went on to study history at St John's College, Cambridge; he earned his BA in 1860 and MA in 1863. Williams married Eliza Smith on 20 November 1860; she died around 1906.

Williams' first book was published in 1865, entitled The Superstitions of Witchcraft. Williams became a vegetarian in 1872, as well as an anti-vivisectionist; he published The Ethics of Diet, a history of vegetarianism, in 1883.

Williams was the inspiration for and one of the founding members of the Humanitarian League, in 1891, which "opposed all avoidable suffering on any sentient being". He remained on the board for several years and authored the "Pioneers of humanity" section for the league's journal, which was later published as a popular pamphlet. He also served as the Vice-President of the London Vegetarian Society and was a board member of the Animal Defence and Anti-Vivisection Society.

Williams died in Aspley Guise, on 21 September 1931.

Publications
The Superstitions of Witchcraft (1865)
The Ethics of Diet: A Catena of Authorities Deprecatory of the Practice of Flesh-eating (1883)
Lucian's Dialogues, namely the Dialogues of the Gods, of the Sea-Gods, and of the Dead; Zeus the Tragedian, the Ferry-Boat etc. (translated with notes and a preliminary memoir, 1888)
"Pioneers of Humanity" (The Humanitarian, 1907; later published as a pamphlet)

References

Further reading
Henry S. Salt, "The Late Mr Howard Williams: An Appreciation", The Vegetarian News, October 1931
Jaime de Magalhães Lima, O Vegetarismo e a Moralidade das raças, 1912
Jon Gregerson, Vegetarianism: A History, Jain Publishing Company, California, 1994, p. 78, 89.
Howard Williams and Carol J. Adams, The Ethics of Diet: A Catena of Authorities Deprecatory of the Practice of Flesh-Eating, University of Illinois Press, 2003.

External links

International Vegetarian Union - Howard Williams

1837 births
1931 deaths
19th-century English historians
19th-century English male writers
20th-century English historians
20th-century English male writers
Alumni of St John's College, Cambridge
Anti-vivisectionists
British vegetarianism activists
English humanitarians
Historians of vegetarianism
People associated with the Vegetarian Society
People from Mendip District